Rushmoor is a local government district and borough in Hampshire, England.  It covers the towns of Aldershot and Farnborough as well as Cove and North Camp.

It was formed on 1 April 1974 by the merger of the borough of Aldershot and the Farnborough urban district.

The borough took its name from Rushmoor Arena, a military showground constructed at Rushmoor Bottom in 1923. In May 2000, a referendum was held on whether to change the name of the borough. Two alternative names were suggested in place of Rushmoor: Aldershot and Farnborough or Farnborough and Aldershot. In the event, more than 81% of those who voted chose to retain the name, on a turnout of 29%.

Rushmoor's population has grown from 1,366 in 1801, through 39,616 in 1901 to over 90,000 in 2001.

For many years, Rushmoor has done well in the South and South East in Bloom awards and was a national finalist on three occasions, winning the "Best Small City" award in 1999.

Rushmoor is twinned with Oberursel in Germany, Meudon in France and Sulechów in Poland.

Elections

Elections to the council are held in three out of every four years, with one third of the seats on the council being elected at each election. Since 1973 the council has either been under Conservative overall control, or no party has had a majority. Since the 2000 election the Conservatives have had a majority, with the last election in 2019 resulting in the council having 26 Conservative, 2 Liberal Democrat and 11 Labour councillors.

Economy

Aviation
The Borough of Rushmoor stated that Farnborough Airfield, including the RAE, historically was a major employment area in Rushmoor. In the 1960s, over 10,000 employees worked at the airport. In May 1996, 5,800 jobs, 13% of the total jobs in Rushmoor, were at the airport. In June 2009, TAG submitted an application to increase the total number of flight movements from 28000 a year to a maximum of 50,000 a year and to increase the number of flight movements at weekends and on Bank Holidays from 5,000 a year to 8,900 a year.  This went to appeal and the secretary of state allowed it to go ahead in February 2011, overruling the Borough Council' refusal.

The Air Accidents Investigation Branch (AAIB), the British aviation accident investigation agency, is based within the airport.

Twin towns - sister cities

Rushmoor is twinned with:
 Dayton, Ohio, United States (since 2019)
 Gorkha Municipality, Nepal (since 2020)
 Meudon, France (since 1974)
 Oberursel, Germany (since 1989)
  Rzeszów, Poland (since 2019)
 Sulechów, Poland (since 2001)

See also

Howard N. Cole, Borough Remembrancer for Aldershot, 1963–1974

References

External links
Rushmoor Borough Council
Rushmoor Arena

 
Non-metropolitan districts of Hampshire
Boroughs in England